The Assistant Secretary of the Treasury for Financial Stability was the head of the Office of Financial Stability in the United States Department of the Treasury.

The position was created on October 3, 2008 by the Emergency Economic Stabilization Act of 2008, the act that created the Office of Financial Stability to administer the Troubled Asset Relief Program.

By law, the Assistant Secretary of the Treasury for Financial Stability is appointed by the President of the United States with the advice and consent of the United States Senate.  During a vacancy, the United States Secretary of the Treasury is authorized to appoint an Acting Assistant Secretary of the Treasury for Financial Stability.

The position was abolished after Timothy Massad.

List of Assistant Secretaries of the Treasury for Financial Stability

See also
 Assistant Secretary of the Treasury

References

 
Troubled Asset Relief Program